Matthew "Matt" Knisely is an American TV Photojournalist and an American author known for professional standards and his vivid editing and use of depth of field in his photography.

Born in York, Pennsylvania, Knisely attended Indiana University of Pennsylvania and Millersville University majoring in Journalism and Philosophy. He got his start as a TV Photojournalist in his home state at two local TV stations, WGAL-TV and WHTM-TV in Harrisburg, Pennsylvania. He then ventured to Europe where he worked internationally as a photojournalist with the British Broadcasting Corporation in East Riding, England. While working in Europe, Knisely covered the Good Friday Peace Agreement Talks and Announcement and additionally the Serbian unilateral cease-fire and partial retreat from Kosovo. After returning to the United States, he worked as a reporter in the Midwest.

Knisely ventured back into photojournalism at KTUL-TV in Tulsa, Oklahoma before moving to KNXV-TV in Phoenix, Arizona. Most notably while at KNXV-TV he and Correspondent Jonathan Elias reported on the compelling images and stories of national unrest during the "Beltway sniper" attacks in the Mid-Atlantic United States. In late 2002, Knisely became the Director of Photography at KMSP/WFTC-TV the FOX duopoly in Minneapolis, Minnesota where he was a mentor and leader to a group of 34 full-time photojournalists and 7 full-time editors. In 2005 he covered the Death of Pope John Paul II, the Papal Conclave, and election of Pope Benedict XVI for FOX News Channel.  In 2007 he and his staff led KMSP-TV in Minneapolis to national honors, when the station was named runner-up as the National Press Photographers Association's Station of the year as one of the best stations in the country for television photography.  Additionally in 2007 and 2008 KMSP-TV became one of the most successful FOX Affiliates in the country.  Knisely has a reputation as a skilled TV Photojournalist and motivator in the business. His work alone has won many honors, including: Associated Press Southwest Press Photographer of the Year; 20 Emmy Awards; 2 RTNDA Edward R. Murrow Awards and more than 70 Regional and National Awards. 

In 2008, Knisely left KMSP/WFTC-TV to start Good World Creative a Creative Consultant Firm for Non-Profits and to serve as Director of Communications and Media for Lawton First Assembly in Oklahoma. He additionally worked as Global Creative Director of Marketing for ACTIVE Network, a San Diego technology solutions company. Currently, Matt works for Gateway Church as their Creative Director. He is also the Author of Framing Faith: From Camera to Pen, An Award-Winning Photojournalist Captures God in a Hurried World a book by HarperCollins Christian publishing that helps connect the seemingly unconnected that lead us to a better life and reveals how to be present in the moment. Besides being an award-winning photojournalist and team builder, Knisely has been a speaker internationally, at numerous universities, and industry conferences.

References 

Living people
1974 births
Indiana University of Pennsylvania alumni
American photojournalists
American male short story writers
Writers from Texas
Writers from Pennsylvania
Emmy Award winners
21st-century American short story writers
21st-century American male writers
21st-century American non-fiction writers
American male non-fiction writers